Miss Brazil 2005 was the 51st edition of the Miss Brazil pageant. It was held on 14 April 2005 at Copacabana Palace in Rio de Janeiro, Rio de Janeiro State, Brazil and was hosted by Nayla Micherif with Roger Gobeth, Juliana Silveira, Igor Cotrim, and Maria Carolina Ribeiro all as commentators. The Pre-Show was hosted by Astrid Fontenelle. Fabiane Niclotti of Rio Grande do Sul crowned her successor Carina Beduschi of Santa Catarina at the end of the event. Beduschi represented Brazil at the Miss Universe 2005 pageant. 1st Runner-Up, Patrícia Reginato of Paraná, represented Brazil at Miss World 2005 and 2nd Runner-Up, Ariane Colombo of Espírito Santo, represented the country at Miss International 2005.

Results

Special Awards

Contestants
The delegates for Miss Brazil 2005 were:

 - Suzana Oltramari
 - Aline Roberta Serafim da Rocha
 - Monique de Paula Houat
 - Danielle Costa de Souza
 - Danielle Cristine Abrantes de Oliveira
 - Daniela Amaral Silva
 - Adriana Watanabe Bambora
 - Ariane Colombo
 - Nevilla Nyoiche Veloso Palmieri
 - Telécia Neves de Souza
 - Fernanda Mara Frasson
 - Laila Teixeira Ramos
 - Tatiane Kelen Barbosa Alves
 - Fernanda de Fátima Barreto e Silva
 - Lilian Vasconcelos Moura
 - Patrícia Reginato
 - Carolline de Castilhos Medeiros
 - Verônica Scheren de Oliveira
 - Carolina Soares Pires
 - Kelyanne F. Medeiros
 - Eunice Vieira Pratti
 - Fabiana Cortez
 - Thaynná de Melo Batista
 - Carina Schlichting Beduschi
 - Glenda Saccomano Castro
 - Claudianne Bomfim dos Santos
 - Francielly de Oliveira Araújo

References

External links 
Official Miss Brasil Website

2005
2005 in Brazil
2005 beauty pageants